Jiggs dinner, also called boiled dinner or cooked dinner, is a traditional meal commonly prepared and eaten on Sundays in Newfoundland. Corned beef and cabbage was the favorite meal of Jiggs, the central character in the popular, long-running comic strip Bringing Up Father by George McManus and Zeke Zekley.

The name of the dish is also occasionally rendered as Jigs dinner or Jigg's dinner, and it may be referred to colloquially as JD.

Ingredients

The meal most typically consists of salt beef (or salt riblets), boiled together with potatoes, carrot, cabbage, turnip, and greens. Pease pudding and figgy duff are cooked in pudding bags immersed in the rich broth that the meat and vegetables create. Condiments are likely to include mustard pickles, pickled beets, cranberry sauce, butter, and a thin gravy made from the cooking broth.

The leftover vegetables from a Jiggs dinner are often mixed into a pan and fried to make a dish known as "cabbage hash" or "corned beef and cabbage hash", much like bubble and squeak.

See also

 Corned beef
 Corned beef and cabbage
 New England boiled dinner

References

External links

 Newfoundland Holiday Traditions

Dinner
Canadian cuisine
Cuisine of Newfoundland and Labrador
Brassica dishes
Bringing Up Father
Holiday foods
Saint Patrick's Day food